The Melbourne Cricket Ground (MCG) is an Australian sports stadium located in Yarra Park in Melbourne, Victoria. The ground was established in 1853 and is the home ground of the Melbourne Cricket Club. It hosted the first match of Test cricket played and has been used for a variety of sports, including acting as the central venue for the 1956 Summer Olympic Games and 2006 Commonwealth Games. It has a spectator capacity of over 90,000, reduced from around 125,000 prior to redevelopments begun in the 1980s, and has been described as "Australia's premier sporting venue". The ground hosted the first One Day International in 1971 and its first Twenty20 International (T20I) in 2008 when both a men's and a women's T20I was played on the same day. The first women's international on the ground was played in 1935 and women's ODI cricket has been played on the ground. It has hosted the finals of the 1988 Women's Cricket World Cup, the 1992 and 2015 Men's World Cups, the 2020 ICC Women's T20 World Cup and will host the final of the 2020 ICC Men's T20 World Cup.

In cricket, a five-wicket haul (also known as a "five-for" or "fifer") refers to a bowler taking five or more wickets in a single innings. This is regarded as a notable achievement. This article details the five-wicket hauls taken on the ground in official international Test and One Day International matches.

The first five-wicket hauls in international cricket were taken in the 1877 Test match at the MCG. Three bowlers took five wickets in an innings in the match, Australia's Billy Midwinter taking the first five-wicket haul in the second innings of the match. England's Alfred Shaw and Australia's Tom Kendall also took five-wicket hauls during the match. The best bowling figures in a Test match innings on the ground are the nine wickets for the cost of 86 runs (9/86) taken by Pakistan's Sarfraz Nawaz against Australia in 1979 in what was described by Wisden as "one of the greatest bowling feats in the history of Test cricket". The best bowling on the ground by an Australian is the 9/121 taken by Arthur Mailey against England in 1921. Australia's Peggy Antonio took the only five-wicket haul in women's international cricket on the ground in 1934 in a Test match against England.

The first five-wicket haul in an ODI on the ground was taken by Pakistan's Abdul Qadir against Australia in 1984. The best ODI bowling figures at the MCG are the 6/42 taken by both Ajit Agarkar in 2004 and Yuzvendra Chahal in 2019. At the time these were the best bowling figures in an ODI in Australia.

Key

Test match five-wicket hauls

There have been a total of 170 five-wicket hauls taken at the MCG in Test matches, one of which was taken in a women's Test match.

Men's matches

Women's matches

One Day International five-wicket hauls

One Day International matches have seen 21 five-wicket hauls taken on the ground, all of them in men's matches.

Notes

References

External links
International five-wicket hauls at Melbourne Cricket Ground, CricInfo

Melbourne Cricket Ground